Roman Urbanczuk is a retired Polish-American soccer forward who played professionally in the American Soccer League and Major Indoor Soccer League.

Early life
Urbanczuk moved to Pennsylvania from Poland with his family before his sophomore year at Louis E. Dieruff High School Allentown, Pennsylvania.  When he arrived, he joined the school's soccer team, being named to the 1977 All State High School list.  He graduated in 1978.

Career
In the fall of 1978, he signed with the Cleveland Force of the Major Indoor Soccer League.  He spent one season with the Force.  In 1979, Urbanczuk joined the expansion Pennsylvania Stoners of the American Soccer League.  He would become the only player to spend all four seasons with the Stoners during its brief existence.  In 1980, Urbanczuk and his teammates won the league championship.  Urbanczuk also played for the Philadelphia Fever during the 1980-1981 MISL season.

Off the field, Urbanczuk owned and operated several successful Subway franchises around his hometown of Allentown.

References

External links 
 MISL stats

Living people
1959 births
American soccer players
American Soccer League (1933–1983) players
Cleveland Force (original MISL) players
Major Indoor Soccer League (1978–1992) players
Pennsylvania Stoners players
Philadelphia Fever (MISL) players
Polish emigrants to the United States
Soccer players from Pennsylvania
Association football forwards
Louis E. Dieruff High School alumni